Sustainable gardening includes the more specific sustainable landscapes, sustainable landscape design, sustainable landscaping, sustainable landscape architecture, resulting in sustainable sites. It comprises a disparate group of horticultural interests that can share the aims and objectives associated with the international post-1980s sustainable development and sustainability programs developed to address that humans are now using natural biophysical resources faster than they can be replenished by nature.

Included within this are those home gardeners, and members of the landscape and nursery industries, and municipal authorities, that integrate environmental, social, and economic factors to create a more sustainable future.

Sustainable Sites Initiative
The Sustainable Sites Initiative is a commercial accreditation body in USA which certifies landscapers and sites using guidelines and performance benchmarks for sustainable land design, for which their registered trademark can be earned after a fee. It was founded in 2005. Using the United Nations Brundtland Report’s definition of sustainable development as a model, it defines sustainability as:

 ...design, construction, operations and maintenance practices that meet the needs of the present without compromising the ability of future generations to meet their own needs by attempting to:

...protect, restore and enhance the ability of landscapes to provide ecosystem services that benefit humans and other organisms.

There is no uniform national standard for a sustainable landscaping project in the USA. Sites are rated according to their impact on ecosystem services: The following ecosystem services have been identified:

 Local climate regulation
 Air and water cleansing
 Water supply and regulation
 Erosion and sediment control
 Hazard mitigation
 Pollination
 Habitat functions
 Waste decomposition and treatment
 Global climate regulation
 Human health and well-being benefits
 Food and renewable non-food products
 Cultural benefits

INPUTS
Fossil fuels
Embodied energy and water
Compost
Mulch
Ecology & biodiversity
Fertilizer
Hard landscape materials
Equipment
Products

OUTPUTS
 Energy & water
 Food
 Green waste
 Ecology & biodiversity
 Chemicals
 Old hard landscape materials
 Old equipment
 Old products

PROCESSES

Principles
Enhancement of ecosystem services is encouraged throughout the life of any site by providing clear design, construction and management criteria. Sustainability requires that environmental, social and economic demands are integrated. Guidelines supplement existing green building guidelines and include metrics (benchmarks, audits, criteria, indexes etc.) that give some measure of sustainability (a rating system) by clarifying what is sustainable or not sustainable or, more likely, what is more or less sustainable.

Impacts of a site can be assessed and measured over any spatio-temporal scale. Impacts of a site may be direct by having direct measurable impacts on biodiversity and ecology at the site itself, or indirect when impacts occur away from the site.

Site principles

The following are some site principles for sustainable gardening:
 do no harm
 use the precautionary principle
 design with nature and culture
 use a decision-making hierarchy of preservation, conservation, and regeneration
 provide regenerative systems as intergenerational equity
 support a living process
 use a system thinking approach
 use a collaborative and ethical approach
 maintain integrity in leadership and research
 foster environmental stewardship

Measuring site sustainability

One major feature distinguishing sustainable gardens, landscapes and sites from other similar enterprises is the quantification of site sustainability by establishing performance benchmarks. Because sustainability is such a broad concept the environmental impacts of sites can be categorised in numerous ways depending on the purpose for which the figures are required. The process can include minimising negative environmental impacts and maximising positive impacts. As currently applied the environment is usually given priority over social and economic factors which may be added in or regarded as an inevitable and integral part of the management process. A home gardener is likely to use simpler metrics than a professional landscaper.

Three methods for measuring site sustainability include BREEAM developed by the BRE organisation in the UK, Leed, developed in America and the Oxford 360 degree sustainability Index used in Oxford Park and developed by the Oxford Sustainable Group in Scandinavia.

See also

 Carbon cycle re-balancing
 Climate-friendly gardening
 Context theory
 Foodscaping
 Green roof
 Landscape planning
 Manure tea
 Public Open Space (POS)
 Roof garden
 Sustainable architecture
 Sustainable design
 Sustainable landscaping
 Sustainable landscape architecture
 Sustainable planting
 Sustainable urban drainage systems
 Urban agriculture
 Urban forestry
 Xeriscaping

References

External links
 Information on designing a sustainable urban landscape
 Sustainable Environmental Design and Landscape Stewardship

 
Horticultural techniques
Sustainable design
Landscape architecture
Types of garden